Philodes flavilimbus is an insect-eating ground beetle of the Philodes genus. It is found in North America.

References

flavilimbus
Beetles described in 1869